This article lists CBR Brave team rosters season-by-season from the inaugural 2014 AIHL season onwards. You can find the current season team roster on the main  CBR Brave page under Players > Current Roster.

Table headers key
 # – Squad number assigned and worn in matches for that season to the player
 Nat – The nationality of the player
 Pos – Position the player played for the Brave that season
 Date of Birth – Player date of birth
 Acquired – The year the CBR Brave acquired the player
 Birthplace – Place of birth of player

Positions key
 F – Forward
 LW – Left Winger
 RW – Right Winger
 C – Centre
 D – Defenceman
 G – Goaltender

2014 AIHL season roster 
Team roster for the 2014 AIHL season

Staff for 2014 AIHL season.

2015 AIHL Season Roster 

Team roster for the 2015 AIHL season

Staff for 2015 AIHL season.

14 July 2015, CBR Brave, through chairman Peter Chamberlain, released a club media statement on Facebook confirming the mutual separation between the club and head coach Brad Hunt with immediate effect. On ice performances during the 2015 AIHL regular season and future planning were cited as the main reasons for the decision. In the same statement the club confirmed current first choice import goaltender, Josh Unice, as the new interim head coach of the CBR Brave for the remainder of the 2015 AIHL season including finals. Josh will be joined by long standing defenceman and alternative captain Aaron Clayworth as his assistant for the remainder of the season. A committee has been established to oversee the selection process of a permanent head coach for the 2016 AIHL season.

2016 AIHL Season Roster 

Team roster for the 2016 AIHL season

Staff for 2016 AIHL season.

 After a freak accident in Art's sixth match for the CBR Brave against the Newcastle North Stars in Newcastle, Art suffered an injury to his voice box that ended his playing career at 25 years of age. After the accident Art become a permanent member of the CBR Brave coaching staff and took up the role of duel Assistant coach alongside the experienced David Rogina.
 17 August 2016, In a shock announcement just a week out from the AIHL Finals weekend The CBR Brave management released a media statement detailing the bombshell sudden departure of Josh Unice from the head coaching position at the club on the grounds of 'personal reasons'. Brave director, Warren Apps, indicated management would promote ex-player and current assistant coach Art Bidlevskii to the role of interim head coach for the remainder of the season.

2017 AIHL Season Roster 

Team roster for the 2017 AIHL season

Staff for 2017 AIHL season.

2018 AIHL Season Roster 
Team roster for the 2018 AIHL season

Staff for 2018 AIHL season.

2019 AIHL Season Roster 
Team roster for the 2019 AIHL season

Notes:

Staff for 2019 AIHL season.

2020-21 AIHL Season Roster 
Never released due to the 2020 and 2021 seasons being cancelled before they began due to the COVID-19 pandemic.

2022 AIHL Season Roster 
Team roster for the 2022 AIHL season

Staff for 2022 AIHL season.

References 

 Former Team
Australian Ice Hockey League players
Australia sport-related lists
Ice hockey-related lists
Canberra-related lists